The gray-throated warbling finch (Microspingus cabanisi) is a species of bird in the family Thraupidae. It is found in forest borders and woodland in south-eastern Brazil, far eastern Paraguay, far north-eastern Argentina, and Uruguay. It was previously considered conspecific with the buff-throated warbling finch, and together they were known as the red-rumped warbling finch. The SACC found enough evidence to split them in 2009.

References

 Assis, C. P., M. A. Raposo & R. Parrini. (2007). Validação de Poospiza cabanisi Bonaparte, 1850 (Passeriformes: Emberizidae). Revista Brasileira de Ornitologia 15(1): 103–102.

gray-throated warbling finch
Birds of Brazil
Birds of Uruguay
gray-throated warbling finch
gray-throated warbling finch
Taxonomy articles created by Polbot